4'-Fluorocannabidiol (also known as PECS-101 and 4'-F-CBD, and formerly as HUF-101 and HU-474) is a fluorinated cannabidiol derivative that has more potent anxiolytic, antidepressant, antipsychotic and anti-compulsive activity in mice compared to its parent compound. It was first synthesized in 2016, alongside 10-fluorocannabidiol diacetate and 8,9-dihydro-7-fluorocannabidiol, which showed much weaker activity.

Synthesis 

4'-Fluorocannabidiol has been synthesized from isolated cannabidiol by putting it in dry dichloromethane and adding 1-fluoropyridinium triflate.

See also 
 7-Hydroxycannabidiol
 8,9-Dihydrocannabidiol
 Abnormal cannabidiol
 Cannabinoids
 Cannabinoid receptors
 HU-331
 KLS-13019
 O-1602
 O-1918

References 

Cannabinoids
Antidepressants
Antipsychotics
Anxiolytics
Pain
Fluoroarenes
2,6-Dihydroxybiphenyls
Cyclohexenes
Substances discovered in the 2010s